The Mozabite people are a Berber ethnic group inhabiting the M'zab natural region in the northern Sahara in Algeria. They speak primarily the Mozabite language, one of the Zenati languages in the Berber branch of the Afroasiatic family. Mozabites are primarily Ibadi Muslims, but there was a small population of Jews as well.

Mozabites mainly live in five oases; namely, Ghardaïa, Beni Isguen, El Atteuf, Melika and Bounoura, as well as two other isolated oases farther north: Berriane and El_Guerrara.

History

According to tradition, the Ibadis, after being overthrown at Tiaret by the Fatimids in the 10th century, took refuge in the country to the south-west of Ouargla and founded an independent state there.

In 1012, further persecutions made them flee to their present location, where they long remained invulnerable.

After the capture of Laghouat by the French, the Mozabites concluded a convention in 1853 and accepted to pay an annual contribution of 1,800 francs in return for their independence. In November 1882, the M'zab country was definitely annexed to French Algeria.

Ghardaïa is the capital of the confederacy, followed in importance by Beni Isguen, the chief commercial centre.

Since the establishment of French control, Beni Isguen has become the depot for the sale of goods from Europe. The Mozabite engineers built a system of irrigation works that made the oases much more fertile than before.

Language

Mozabites speak Mozabite, a branch of the Zenati group of Berber languages. Many also speak Algerian Arabic as a second language.

Mozabite Jews in French Algeria 
It is not canonically agreed when Jews first came to Southern Algeria, but one theory suggests they were sent there by the Ibadite leadership in the 14th century from Tunisia, as part of a merchant trade route. They continued as a merchant community, with subsequent waves of immigration during times of anti-Semitism across the Sahara, Europe, and the Middle East. In 1881, one year before the French annexed the Mzab, there were estimated 3,000 Mozabite Jews out of the 30,000 Algerian Jews. By 1921, the latter number would grow to 74,000, a result of a spike in anti-Semitism in the later 1800s and early 1900s, but the Mozabite Jewish community would remain small, with most Jewish migrants settling in the north.

In 1882, when the French military annexed the Mzab, it began an administrative rule that was separate from the northern departments. Unlike their northern Jewish counterparts, many of the Mozabite Berber Jews in Southern Algeria were classified by the French under the “indigenous code”. Given the diversity of the Mzab Jewish population, the French administration incorporated some “culturally Saharan” but ethnically non-indigenous Jews to the north and gave them citizenship under the Crémieux Decree of 1870. That perceived distinction by the French between Berber and non-Berber Jews of the Mzab was not a reflection of “technical precision” but rather “a manufactured form of legal difference”. While the French sought to assimilate the Northern Jewry as French citizens, they recognised religious rule of the Mozabite Jewish population and kept them separate under indigenous law, which meant severely limiting its political and social power.

With anti-Semitism on the rise in the late 1800s, the French colonial powers sought to decrease Jewish commerce in the south and prevent further Jewish collaboration with Muslim communities. They continued to distance the Mozabite Jews from other Algerian Jewish affairs by keeping Mozabite, or “Mosaic” laws for civil matters, and French indigenous laws for public and criminal matters. It was not until 1961, with the French National Assembly Law 61-805, that the Mozabite Jews were granted “common law civil status” and French citizenship.

Genetics
Mozabite people are characterized by a very high level of North African haplogroups E1b1b1b (M81) (86%) and U6 (28%).

Y-DNA

mtDNA

See also
Mzab (Moroccan tribe)

References

 A. Coyne, Le Mzab (Algiers, 1879); Rinn, Occupation du Mzab (Algiers, 1885)
 Amat, Le M'Zab el les M'Zabites (Paris, 1888)

Berber peoples and tribes
Berbers in Algeria
Ethnic groups in Algeria
Muslim communities in Africa
Indigenous peoples of North Africa